is a 2001 Japanese melodrama novel, written by Kyoichi Katayama and published by Shogakukan, which revolves around narrator Sakutaro Matsumoto's recollections of a school classmate whom he once loved.

Plot summary

In a small town of southern Japan, Sakutaro "Saku" Matsumoto and Aki Hirose, classmates since junior high, become high school students. During this time they begin to date and their conversations circle around the idea of what love really is, beginning after Saku's grandfather shares his own past love story with Saku.

After a trip the two take to an abandoned island, Aki discovers she has leukemia, which limits her chances to go outside or see Saku. Once Saku learns the truth, he buys flight tickets to take Aki to Australia's Uluru (Ayers Rock); a place she had always wanted to visit after missing the school trip there, but she dies before she could board the plane.

The story takes place as a flashback through Saku's eyes as he and Aki's parents travel to Australia to spread Aki's ashes in the place she had always wanted to see.

Main characters
 Sakutaro "Saku" Matsumoto (松本朔太郎 Matsumoto Sakutarō, サク "Saku"): the narrator who's referred as "Saku-chan" by Aki. His name is taken from Japanese poet Sakutarō Hagiwara's name.
 Aki Hirose (廣瀬亜紀 Hirose Aki, アキ "Aki"): Saku's classmate who later becomes his girlfriend. She has leukemia.
 Ryunosuke Oki (大木龍之介 Ōki Ryūnosuke): a classmate of Saku and Aki. His name is based on Japanese writer Ryūnosuke Akutagawa's name.
 Kentaro Matsumoto (松本謙太郎 Matsumoto Kentarō): Saku's grandfather.

About the title

Socrates in Love is the English translation of author Katayama's original Japanese title, 恋するソクラテス (Koi Suru Sokuratesu).

The novel and its manga adaptation (illustrated by Kazumi Kazui) were published in the United States by VIZ Media under the English translated title of author Katayama's original title.

The 2004 film title, Sekai no Chūshin de, Ai o Sakebu, is abbreviated in Japan as Sekachū (セカチュー).

To date, the 2005 Hong Kong DVD release of the 2004 film adaptation is the only English-language release that has its title Crying Out Love, In the Center of the World in English. The 2004 film and the 2004 TV series still haven't been released to the English-language market outside Hong Kong.

Notes about the novel
Katayama had intended Socrates in Love as part of a trilogy to explore the concept and themes of youth and memories. His editors however decided to take advantage of the "pure Love boom"—a Japanese media trend of novels and films that portray a chaste, undying and tragic love—by publishing the novel under Crying Out Love, in the Center of the World to appeal fans of tragic love stories. In spite of this, only 8,000 copies of the book were printed and distributed, due to the poor sales of Katayama's two previous novels.

A year after the novel's publication, celebrity actress Kou Shibasaki wrote in a guest column for Japanese monthly literary and pop culture magazine Da Vinci (March 2002 issue): "I read it thoroughly even though it made me cry. I wished to have such a relationship in my life." The book became a best-seller, due to Shibasaki's recommendation and the word of mouth. In May 2004 over 3 million copies were sold, surpassing the sales record of Haruki Murakami's Norwegian Wood. Shibasaki subsequently appeared in the 2004 film version.

Film and television adaptations

Japanese film (2004)

Crying Out Love, In the Center of the World was opened nationally in Japan on 8 May 2004, which brought Masami Nagasawa recognition as an actress. It was a huge success, and its theme song, "Hitomi o Tojite" ("With My Eyes Closed") by Ken Hirai, had record sales as well.

Television drama (2004)
Crying out Love, in the Center of the World was adapted as an 11-episode  TV drama series, directed by Yukihiko Tsutsumi, and broadcast every Friday on TBS at 10PM, from 2 July to 10 September, in 2004.

Like the film, the drama features an original character that doesn't appear in the novel — Aki Kobayashi, a single-mother friend of adult Sakutaro. She has feelings for him, but he struggles not to see her as the late Aki's replacement. Their situation is complicated when Aki's young son sees Saku as a father figure.

The drama's theme song, "Katachi Aru Mono" (Some Kind of Form), is notable for having been written and performed by Kou Shibasaki, who appeared as Ritsuko Fujimura in the 2004 film adaptation.

Staff
 Script - Yoshiko Morishita
 Filming - Satoru Karasawa
 Direction - Yukihiko Tsutsumi, Yasuharu Ishii, Yuichiro Hirakawa
  Producer - Akihiko Ishimaru
Theme song -  by Kou Shibasaki

Cast
Takayuki Yamada - Sakutaro "Saku" Matsumoto (age 17) 
Haruka Ayase - Aki Hirose 
Naoto Ogata - Sakutaro "Saku" Matsumoto (age 34)
Sachiko Sakurai - Aki Kobayashi 
Koutaro Tanaka - Ryunosuke Ooki 
Tasuku Emoto - Akiyoshi Nakagawa 
Yuika Motokariya - Tomoyo Ueda 
Kaho - Fumiko Matsumoto 
Yuki Matsushita - Toshimi Yatabe  
Katsumi Takahashi - Junichiro Matsumoto 
Satoko Oshima - Tomiko Matsumoto 
Satomi Tezuka - Ayako Hirose
Tomokazu Miura - Makoto Hirose 
Tatsuya Nakadai (Special appearance) - Kentaro Matsumoto

Awards

Korean film (2004)

The 2004 film was remade and released in South Korea as My Girl and I on 23 December 2005. It was then released in Japan on 26 August 2006, under its Japanese title, You Are the Center of My World (僕の、世界の中心は、君だ Boku no, Sekai no Chūshin wa, Kimi da).

Chinese film (2016)

See also 
YU-NO: A Girl Who Chants Love at the Bound of this World
The Beast that Shouted Love at the Heart of the World

References

External links
 
 Movie's site Japanese site 
 Drama's site by TBS Japanese site 

2001 Japanese novels
2004 Japanese television series debuts
2004 Japanese television series endings
2004 manga
Japanese novels adapted into films
Japanese romance novels
Josei manga
Kin'yō Dorama
Novels set in Japan
Romance anime and manga
Shogakukan manga
Television shows written by Yûji Sakamoto
Viz Media manga
Viz Media novels